Some Disenchanted Evening is an album by The Verlaines. It was released in 1990 on Flying Nun Records.

Critical reception
Trouser Press wrote that "the album’s coda, a piano ballad styled after Randy Newman, is actually the collection’s crowning achievement; harnessing a dapper melody to a bitterly sardonic lyric about failure, it reveals new-found subtlety and clarity in [Graeme] Downes’ writing." The New York Times called the album "full of complex melodic variations, crescendos and elegant tempo shifts; the music has the theatrical grandeur of a symphony within the confines of rock."

Track listing
All songs written by Graeme Downes, except where noted.
"Jesus What a Jerk" - 2:37
"The Funniest Thing" - 3:14
"Whatever You Run Into" - 3:18
"Faithfully Yours" - 3:43
"Damn Shame" - 5:02
"This Train" - 4:20
"Down The Road" - 3:13
"We're All Gonna Die" - 3:06
"Anniversary" - 4:20
"Come Sunday" - 4:01
"It Was" - 2:27

References 

The Verlaines albums
1990 albums
Flying Nun Records albums